Placosaris is a genus of snout moths in the subfamily Pyraustinae of the family Crambidae. It is placed in the tribe Pyraustini.

The genus currently comprises 25 species, which are exclusively distributed in the Indomalayan realm and New Guinea. A taxonomic revision from 1970 covers the species distributed in Temperate East Asia.

Species

Placosaris leucula species group:
Placosaris callistalis (Hampson, 1896)
Placosaris cricophora (West, 1931)
Placosaris egerialis (Snellen, 1899)
Placosaris galogalis Munroe & Mutuura, 1970
Placosaris ingestalis (Snellen, 1899)
Placosaris leucula Meyrick, 1897
Placosaris triticalis Kenrick 1907
Placosaris turiusalis (Walker, 1859)

Placosaris intensalis species group:
Placosaris arjunoalis Munroe & Mutuura, 1970
Placosaris auranticilialis (Caradja, 1925)
Placosaris coorumba (Hampson, 1891)
Placosaris dohertyi Munroe & Mutuura, 1970
Placosaris intensalis (Swinhoe, 1894)
Placosaris lindgreni Munroe & Mutuura, 1970
Placosaris ochreipunctalis (Warren, 1896)
Placosaris rubellalis (Caradja, 1925)
Placosaris steelei Munroe & Mutuura, 1970
Placosaris subfuscalis (Caradja in Caradja & Meyrick, 1933)
Placosaris swanni Munroe & Mutuura, 1970
Placosaris taiwanalis (Shibuya, 1928)
Placosaris ustulalis (Hampson, 1896)

Unplaced in any species group:
Placosaris apoalis Munroe & Mutuura, 1970
Placosaris bornealis Munroe & Mutuura, 1970
Placosaris perakalis Munroe & Mutuura, 1970
Placosaris udealis Munroe & Mutuura, 1970

References

Pyraustinae
Crambidae genera
Taxa named by Edward Meyrick